The former First Church of Christ, Scientist, built in 1909, is an historic building located at 1813 NW Everett Street, in Portland, Oregon. It was designed by noted Chicago architect Solon Spencer Beman, who designed many Christian Science churches. On October 2, 1978, the building was added to the National Register of Historic Places.

It is now  the Northwest Neighborhood Cultural Center (NWNCC).

See also
National Register of Historic Places listings in Northwest Portland, Oregon
List of former Christian Science churches, societies and buildings
First Church of Christ, Scientist (disambiguation)

References

External links
 National Register listing
 NWNCC history
 NWNCC website

1909 establishments in Oregon
20th-century Christian Science church buildings
Beaux-Arts architecture in Oregon
Churches in Portland, Oregon
Culture of Portland, Oregon
Former Christian Science churches, societies and buildings in Oregon
National Register of Historic Places in Portland, Oregon
Northwest Portland, Oregon
Churches on the National Register of Historic Places in Oregon
Churches completed in 1909
Solon Spencer Beman church buildings
Portland Historic Landmarks